Henry Unwin Addington (24 March 1790 – 6 March 1870) was a British diplomat and civil servant.

Background
Born at Blounts Court, he was the second son of John Hiley Addington, brother of Henry Addington, 1st Viscount Sidmouth, and his wife Mary, daughter of Henry Unwin. He was educated at Winchester School and entered the Foreign Office in 1807.

Career
Addington was attached to the diplomatic mission to Sicily under William Amherst, 1st Earl Amherst in 1809 and took part in the negotiations between Spain and his colonies in 1812. He was transferred to Berlin in April 1813 and to Stockholm in September. In the next year he was appointed Secretary of Legation to Switzerland, an office he held until 1818. He executed this position again in Copenhagen in 1821, however became chargé d'affaires in Washington already a year later.

Addington was promoted to plenipotentiary in London for negotiations with the United States of America in 1826, and was moved to Frankfurt am Main as Minister Plenipotentiary to the German Confederation in 1828. In the following year he was appointed Envoy Extraordinary to Spain. In 1833, he returned to England and became Permanent Under-Secretary of State for Foreign Affairs in 1842. In 1854, he retired and was sworn of the Privy Council of the United Kingdom.

Family
On 17 November 1836, he married Eleanor Anne Estcourt, eldest daughter of Thomas Grimston Bucknall Estcourt at St George's, Hanover Square.

References

Literature
Oliver Werner, Privater Eindruck und öffentliche Politik. Der britische Diplomat Henry Unwin Addington in Deutschland, 1813/14 und 1828/29. In: Uwe Ziegler/Horst Carl (ed.), "In unserer Liebe nicht glücklich." Kultureller Austausch zwischen Großbritannien und Deutschland 1770-1840, Goettingen (Vandenhoeck & Ruprecht) 2014, p. 143-158.

1790 births
1870 deaths
Members of the Privy Council of the United Kingdom
People educated at Winchester College
Permanent Under-Secretaries of State for Foreign Affairs
Ambassadors of the United Kingdom to Germany
Ambassadors of the United Kingdom of Great Britain and Ireland to Spain